Phlegra arborea is a jumping spider species in the genus Phlegra that lives in South Africa. The male was first described in 2009.

References

Endemic fauna of South Africa
Salticidae
Spiders of South Africa
Spiders described in 2009
Taxa named by Wanda Wesołowska